Liga ASOBAL 1991–92 season was the second since its establishment. The league was played in a two phases. In the first phase, a total of 16 teams were separate in two groups of eight teams. The first four of every groups passed to the second phase for the title. The last four passed to the second phase for the permanence in Liga ASOBAL.

First phase

Group A

Group B

Second phase

Group I

Group II

In–Out promotion

1st leg

2nd leg

Helados Alacant & Sociedad Conquense remained in Liga ASOBAL.

Top goal scorers

1991-92
handball
handball 
Spain